Parce qu'on vient de loin is the debut album released by Corneille at the end of 2002. It reached #4 in the French Albums Chart staying a total of 99 weeks in the chart.

In 2006, the album was rereleased as a package Parce qu'on vient de loin / Les marchands de rêves with the follow-up album of Corneille Les marchands de rêves

Track list
 "Seul au monde"
 "Terre"
 "Sans rancune"
 "Ca m'va"
 "Rêves de star"
 "Avec classe"
 "Parce qu'on vient de loin"
 "On regarde"
 "Tout va bien"
 "Ensemble"
 "Toi"
 "Va (On se verra)"
 "Qu'est-ce que tu fais?"
 "Comme un fils"
 "Parce qu'on vient de loin" (version acoustique)
 "D'amour ou d'amitié"

2003: Deluxe Edition

After the success of the album in Canada, the following year a Deluxe edition (édition deluxe) was released including additional recordings.

Track list
Disc 1
 "Seul au monde"
 "Terre"
 "Sans rancune"
 "Ca me va"
 "Rêves de star"
 "Avec classe"
 "Parce qu'on vient de loin"
 "On regarde"
 "Tout va bien"
 "Ensemble"
 "Toi"
 "Va (On se verra)"
 "Qu'est-ce que tu fais?"
 "Comme un fils"
 "Laissez-nous vivre"
 "Avec classe" (version acoustique)

Disc 2
 "Sans rancune" (version acoustique)
 "Parce qu'on vient de loin" (version acoustique)
 "Seul au monde" (version acoustique)
 "Rêves de star" (version acoustique)
 "Qu'est-ce que tu fais?" (version acoustique)

Video bonus
 Clip "Avec Classe"
 Clip "Ensemble"
 Clip "Rêves de star"
 Making of "Rêves de star"

References

2002 debut albums
Corneille (singer) albums
European Border Breakers Award-winning albums